Keisabadi is a type of dance performed in Odisha. This type of dance is performed only by men. During the dance, people sing in Sambalpuri. In every stanza, they shout "Haido!" The dance is based on the love story of Radha and Krishna.

References

Dances of India
Culture of Odisha